Monica Mogre - Case Files is a Hindi-language thriller series on Zee TV, which consists of short stories where Inspector Monica Mogre deals with very dangerous cases involved with crime. The series premiered on 10 January 2009 until 21 March 2009.

The series is produced by Yash Patnaik of Beyond Dreams Productions, and features a series of small crime cases, with each story lasting for about 10 to 12 episodes long.

Premise
The plot revolves around a 21-year-old Inspector Monica Mogre, who helps the public from dangerous criminals by jeopardizing her own life. In addition, to being a cop, she is the only strength for her parents, who want her to get married. Hence, they don't think too much about their daughter's police career, despite the fact that they are proud of her achievements. Besides, her marriage proposals get rejected every time, due to her being as a cop officer. Therefore, putting her parents into more worries. Her best friend's name is Marisa.

Cast 
Parakh Madan ... Inspector Monica Mogre
 ... ACP Rana
Mahesh Manjrekar ... Deep Raj Mathur
Sumit Malhan ... Harry Saluja
Sudhanshu Pandey ... Hritvik

References

External links
Monica Mogre Official Site

Indian television soap operas
Indian crime television series
Zee TV original programming
2009 Indian television series debuts
2009 Indian television series endings